Rarabe ka Phalo (about 1722 - 1787) was a Xhosa Prince and the founder of the Right Hand House of the Xhosa nation. Rarabe was the eldest son and right hand son of King Phalo ka Tshiwo.

Rharhabe died near present-day Dohne in the Eastern Cape province.

Family
He fathered the following known children (Mlawu ka Rarabe (Great son), Ndlambe ka Rarabe, Sigcawu ka Rarabe, Cebo ka Rarabe (Right Hand son), Hlahla ka Rarabe, Nzwane ka Rarabe, Mnyaluza ka Rarabe, Ntsusa ka Rarabe (a daughter) and  Nukwa ka Rarabe.

Death

Rharhabe-Qwathi War 
Rharhabe's daughter Ntsusa married the Qwathi chief Mdandala, who as dowry(lobola) sent a miserable hundred head of cattle to Rharhabe. This was seen by Rharhabe as a great insult for someone of his stature so he sent his Right Hand Son Cebo to Thembuland to demand more cattle. When Cebo arrived at Mdandala's homestead to demand the cattle as instructed by Rharhabe, the amaQwathi fell upon this prince and killed him.

These events enraged Rharhabe so he with his army entered Thembuland to remedy the affront at the tip of an assegai(spear). War broke out where the Rharhabe scattered the amaQwathi and seized many of their cattle. Chief Mdandala is said to have died in this battle. Although the Qwathis were defeated, Rharhabe was fatally wounded and died. This battle is estimated to have occurred around 1787.

Xhosa people
18th-century Xhosa people
Year of birth uncertain
1782 deaths